The CWA Ian Fleming Steel Dagger is an annual award given by the British Crime Writers' Association for best thriller of the year. The award is sponsored by the estate of Ian Fleming.

It is given to a title that fits the broadest definition of the thriller novel; these can be set in any period and include, but are not limited to, spy fiction and/or action/ adventure stories. Ian Fleming said there was one essential criterion for a good thriller – that “one simply has to turn the pages”; this is one of the main characteristics that the judges will be looking for.

Winners

2000s

2010s

2020s

References 

Crime Writers' Association awards
Awards established in 2002
2002 establishments in the United Kingdom
Mystery and detective fiction awards